Ambrose St John (1760–1822) of Prior Park, Berkshire and The Close, Winchester, Hampshire, was a Member of Parliament for Callington in Cornwall and was Lt-Col Commandant of the Supply Militia of Worcestershire.

Origins
He was the eldest son of Very Rev. St Andrew St John (1732–1795), Dean of Worcester Cathedral, the second son of John St John, 11th Baron St John of Bletso.

He was educated at Christ Church, Oxford and the Inner Temple.

Marriage and children
He married Arabella Hamlyn (d. 1805), only daughter of Sir James Hamlyn, 1st Baronet (1735–1811) (born "James Hammet") of Clovelly Court in Devon, and of Edwinsford, Carmarthenshire, Wales, a Member of Parliament  for Carmarthen 1793–1802 and Sheriff of Devon 1767–8. Her mother was Arabella Williams (died 1797), daughter and eventual heiress of  Thomas Williams (died 1792) of  Edwinsford, Llandeilo,  and of Court Derllys, both in Carmarthenshire. By Arabella he had issue two sons and five daughters, including:

St Andrew St John;
Beauchamp St John (d. 18 April 1827) who died at Douglas, Isle of Man.

Death
He died at Douglas, Isle of Man, on 29 November 1822. His monument survives in Worcester Cathedral.

References

Further reading
Thorne, R.G., biography of St John, Ambrose (1760-1822), of Prior Park, Berks. and The Close, Winchester, Hants., published in History of Parliament: House of Commons 1790–1820, ed. R. Thorne, 1986 

1760 births
1822 deaths
Alumni of Christ Church, Oxford
Members of the Inner Temple
Members of the Parliament of the United Kingdom for Callington
Politicians from Berkshire
Politicians from Winchester
British Militia officers
UK MPs 1802–1806